Kausani (Kumaoni: Kôsānī) is a hill station and Village situated in Bageshwar district in the state of Uttarakhand, India. It is famous for its scenic splendour and its spectacular 300 km-wide panoramic view of Himalayan peaks like Trisul, Nanda Devi and Panchchuli. Mahatma Gandhi called this place the 'Switzerland of India', due to similarity in landscapes.

History
During Independence of India in 1947, Kausani was situated in the Almora District till 15 September 1997 after which Bageshwar district was carved out of Almora district.  On 9 November 2000, the State of Uttarakhand was created from the Himalayan and adjoining northwestern districts of Uttar Pradesh.

Geography

Kausani lies in the Kumaon division and is situated  North-East of Nainital, the Headquarters of Kumaon. Nearby Towns include Garur and Someshwar. Kausani lies atop a ridge amidst dense pine trees overlooking Someshwar valley on one side and Garur and Katyuri valley on the other on Almora-Bageshwar-Didihat Highway. Kausani is a part of the Lesser Himalayas, a region watered by rivers like Kosi, Gomti and Ramganga. Their banks, known as seras, are highly fertile.

Climate
Temperature ranges between 10 °C to 26 °C in summers. Winters are quite cold with temperature ranging between 15 °C to 2 °C. Rainfall lies between Max 3048 mm and Min 1777 mm.

Demographics
According to Census 2011 information the location code or village code of Kausani State village is 051443. Kausani State village is located in Garur Tehsil of Bageshwar district in Uttarakhand, India. As per 2009 stats, Kausani is the gram panchayat of Kausani State village.

Kausani State is a large village located in Garur of Bageshwar district, Uttarakhand with total 512 families residing. The total geographical area of village is 429.92 hectares. Kausani State has a total population of 2,408 of which 1195 are males while 1213 are females as per Population Census 2011.

In Kausani State village population of children with age 0-6 is 334 which makes up 13.87% of total population of village. Average sex ratio of Kausani State village is 1015 which is higher than Uttarakhand state average of 963. Child Sex Ratio for the Kausani State as per census is 825, lower than Uttarakhand average of 890.

Kausani State village has higher literacy rate compared to Uttarakhand. In 2011, literacy rate of Kausani State village was 87.80% compared to 78.82% of Uttarakhand. In Kausani State Male literacy stands at 96.25% while female literacy rate was 79.76%.

In Kausani State village, most of the villagers are from Schedule Caste (SC). Schedule Caste (SC) constitutes 45.47% while Schedule Tribe (ST) were 0.33% of total population in Kausani State village.

In Kausani State village out of total population, 1086 were engaged in work activities. 54.24% of workers describe their work as Main Work (Employment or Earning more than 6 Months) while 45.76% were involved in Marginal activity providing livelihood for less than 6 months. Of 1086 workers engaged in Main Work, 187 were cultivators (owner or co-owner) while 16 were Agricultural labourer.

As per constitution of India and Panchyati Raaj Act, Kausani State village is administrated by Sarpanch (Head of Village) who is elected representative of village. Kumaoni is spoken by majority however, Hindi and Sanskrit are the official languages.

Economy
Many of Kausani's men serve in the army – a phenomenon common in the northern hill towns of the country. The rest of the population depends on agriculture and allied activities, tourism and other small businesses for their livelihood. The local handloom factory produces shawls, woolen apparel and blankets. Besides handloom products, the factory sells other local artefacts and tea from Kausani's tea estate. Kausani Tea Estate was established in 2000-2001 and produces 70,000 kg Tea.

In Kausani State village out of total population, 1086 were engaged in work activities. 54.24% of workers describe their work as Main Work (Employment or Earning more than 6 Months) while 45.76% were involved in Marginal activity providing livelihood for less than 6 months. Of 1086 workers engaged in Main Work, 187 were cultivators (owner or co-owner) while 16 were Agricultural labourer.

Tourism

Tourist attractions
Anashakti Ashram is a quiet and revered place where Mahatma Gandhi spent some days and wrote his commentary of Anashakti Yog. The KMVN (Kumaon Mandal Vikas Nigam) resthouse in Kausani is an ideal place to stay and it provides panoramic views of the mountains.

Lakshmi Ashram is one kilometre away from the Kausani, and is a center run by Kumauni women and dedicated to social service and the upliftment of women. Gandhiji's disciple, Sarla Behn (Kaitherine Heileman) established the ashram in 1946, and spent her life here doing social service and also established Anashakti Ashram. Lakshmi ashram is located in a solitary area among dense pine forest.

Tea gardens (5 km on Bageshwar Road), Baijnath group of temples (16.5 km on Bageshwar Road) and Bageshwar are the places of interest nearby. A fabulous collection of high quality woollen shawls, exquisitely designed by the local weavers, can be purchased from Kumaon Shawl Emporium.

Pant Museum is named after the famous Hindi poet, Sumitranandan Pant, who was born in Kausani, the Museum has the articles of his daily use, drafts of his poems, letters, his awards etc. This Museum is at a short distance from the Kausani bus terminal.

Treks Near Kausani

 Pindari Glacier Trek
 Kafni Glacier Trek
 Sunder Dhunga Trek
 Milam Glacier Trek
 Rudrahari cave temple trek
 Kafari (3 km from Kausani)

Places around Kausani

 Almora
 Baijnath
 Bageshwar
 Garur
 Chaukori
 Berinag
 Gwaldam
 Badhan Gari Mandir
 Angayaari Mandir
 Kote Mai Mandir
 Krishna gari
 Laubanj Village
 Rudradhari Dham
 Saroli

Transport
Pantnagar Airport, located in Pantnagar (178 km) is the primary Airport serving entire Kumaon Region. Indira Gandhi International Airport, located in Delhi (431 km) is the nearest international Airport. Kathgodam railway station (145 km) is the nearest railway station.
Kausani is well connected by motorable roads with major destinations of Uttarakhand state and northern India. Bus Services are provided by Uttarakhand Transport Corporation and K.M.O.U.(Kumaon Motor Owners Union limited). Regular Taxis are available to Almora, Bageshwar, Garur, someshwar and other major destinations of Kumaon region.

Education
There are mainly government-run, private unaided (no government help) and private aided schools in the city. The language of instruction in the schools is either English or Hindi. The main school affiliations are CBSE and UBSE, the state syllabus defined by the Uttarakhand Board of School Education of the Government of Uttarakhand. Kausani State village has higher literacy rate compared to Uttarakhand. In 2011, literacy rate of Kausani State village was 87.80% compared to 78.82% of Uttarakhand. In Kausani State Male literacy stands at 96.25% while female literacy rate was 79.76%.

In Films
The movie 1942: A Love Story was filmed in this region and bears a resemblance to depict pre-independence India for filming purpose.

Notable people
 Sumitranandan Pant (20 May 1900 – 28 December 1977) was born in Kausani Village.
 Mahatma Gandhi (2 October 1869 – 30 January 1948) stayed here for 14 days at the Anashakti Ashram, while scripting his book titled ‘Anashakti Yoga’.
 Harish Bisht - Eastern Naval Command chief was born in Kausani Village.

References

External links 

Cities and towns in Bageshwar district
Hill stations in Uttarakhand
Tourism in Uttarakhand
Bageshwar district